Bishop Quinn High School was a small, private Catholic high school in Palo Cedro near Redding, California. The school is named after Bishop Francis Quinn, the diocese's bishop emeritus. The school was designed to serve the Catholic population of Shasta County, California.

History
The school was founded in 1995 by the Roman Catholic Diocese of Sacramento. Although initially falling short of desired number of pupils, the school had grown to approximately 200 students from an inaugural class of 26. The 26 freshman who matriculated in 1995 represented the school's first graduating class in 1999. With the closing of St. Francis Middle School in 2007 (which was located on the same campus) Bishop Quinn saw a drop in attendance to around 85 students in the 2007–2008 school year, 22 of whom were seniors. Bishop Quinn closed after the 07–08 school year due to the low attendance which continued to drop. This made their rival school, Mercy High School in Red Bluff, California, the only Catholic high school north of Sacramento.

Other local schools
Elementary schools:
North Cow Creek School
Junction Elementary School
Chrysalis Charter School
Middle schools
Junction Intermediate School
Saint Francis Middle School
Chrysalis Charter School
High schools
Foothill High School

References
Cedro, P. "Bishop Quinn Rules: Take-no-prisoners principal puts new Catholic high school on the fast track." The Sacramento Bee (January 1, 2002), pg. B1.

External links
School website
Private School Review

Educational institutions established in 1995
Defunct Catholic secondary schools in California
Educational institutions disestablished in 2008
Roman Catholic Diocese of Sacramento
Defunct schools in California
Defunct high schools in Shasta County, California
1995 establishments in California
2008 disestablishments in California